Hitzler Werft is a shipyard in Lauenberg, Germany, just outside Hamburg. The company was founded in 1885 by Johann Georg Hitzler as a boat repair yard, and went on to build barges, trawlers, freighters, tankers, tugs, launches, barges and icebreakers.

Icebreakers
The icebreakers Hitzler Werft has built include:

References

German companies established in 1885
Shipyards of Germany
Shipbuilding companies of Germany
Companies based in Schleswig-Holstein
Manufacturing companies established in 1885